Channel 41 refers to several television stations:

 One Sports Channel 41 in the Philippines.
 Indosiar, Indonesia on Channel 41 UHF for the Jakarta territories.

Canada
The following television stations broadcast on digital or analog channel 41 (UHF frequencies covering 633.25-637.75 MHz) in Canada:
 CHCH-TV-4 in Sudbury, Ontario
 CICT-DT in Calgary, Alberta
 CIII-DT-41 in Toronto, Ontario
 CIMT-DT-6 in Rivière-du-Loup, Quebec

The following television stations operate on virtual channel 41 in Canada:
 CIII-DT-41 in Toronto, Ontario

See also
 Channel 41 TV stations in Mexico
 Channel 41 digital TV stations in the United States
 Channel 41 virtual TV stations in the United States
 Channel 41 low-power TV stations in the United States

41